Cholla High School (also known as Cholla High Magnet School) is a public high school, located on the West Side of Tucson, Arizona, United States.  Cholla is a magnet high school (drawing students from the entire district) in the Tucson Unified School District and serves over 1,700, students, grades 9–12.  The school name originates from the cholla cactus, which is prominent throughout Tucson and Arizona.  The school mascot is the Charger (a medieval war horse) and the school colors are orange and blue.

School history
Opened in 1969 on the west side of Tucson, constructed by the Del E. Webb Corporation. Cholla High Magnet School has become widely known as the high school that former San Antonio Spurs Sean Elliott attended before enrolling at the University of Arizona. The school's gymnasium has since been renamed the "Sean Elliott Gymnasium", and Elliott's high school jerseys grace the walls.

Academics
Cholla's magnet specialties/academic themes include The Global Village (an intercultural / international and law-related studies program), an English Language development program, parent support groups, social workers, Gifted and Talented Education (GATE) program, honors programs, career counseling, student assistance programs, International Baccalaureate (biology, chemistry, math, history, English, Spanish, German art, drama), Advanced Placement (biology, chemistry, physics, American government, calculus, Spanish, English), English honors programs, the QUICC Program (Quality Instruction in a Continuous Curriculum), ASSIST Program, music theory, folklorico, mariachi programs and ethnic studies programs.

Athletics
Cholla presently competes in the 5A Sonoran Conference, Division I.

Notable alumni
 Sean Elliott (1985): former professional NBA basketball player
 Vance Johnson (1981): former NFL football star for the Denver Broncos
 Ajak Magot: Former Idaho State basketball player and current professional player for Arino Basket Termoli  Italy 
 Mel Stocker: former MLB player (Milwaukee Brewers)
 David Tineo: artist, teacher, political activist

References

External links
 Official website
 Arizona Department of Education School Report Card

Educational institutions established in 1969
Public high schools in Arizona
International Baccalaureate schools in Arizona
Schools in Tucson, Arizona
Magnet schools in Arizona
1969 establishments in Arizona